Phoebe Philo OBE (born 1 January 1973) is a British fashion designer. She was the creative director of fashion brands Céline from 2008 to 2018 and Chloé from 2001 to 2006.

Early life and education
Philo was born in Paris to British parents working there. Her father, Richard, is a surveyor and her mother, Celia, is an art dealer and graphic artist who had a hand in creating David Bowie's Aladdin Sane album cover. The family returned to Britain when she was two years old, and she was raised in Harrow, London, with her two younger siblings Louis and Frankie. In 1987, at the age of 14, she began customizing her clothes after receiving a sewing machine as a birthday present from her parents.

Philo studied at Central Saint Martins College of Art and Design in London, graduating in 1996. She graduated showing a final student collection that The Guardian would later describe as having a "Latino influence and huge gold jewellery". She quickly joined Chloé as Stella McCartney's first assistant for ready-to-wear collection in Paris.

Career

Chloé, 1997–2006
Philo began working for Chloé in 1997 as Stella McCartney's design assistant, succeeding her as creative director in 2001. At Chloé, she was credited with ushering in the trend for babydoll dresses and heavy leather accessories, such as the Paddington bag. During that time, she also became the first designer at a major fashion brand to take an official extended maternity leave.

In 2002, Philo commissioned Sophie Hicks to create a concept for the Chloé stores.

In 2006 Philo left Chloé. She subsequently moved back to London to be with her family and had her second child. She later told The Guardian in 2009 that after stepping down from Chloé, she had explored launching her own line, but “the time wasn’t right”.

Céline, 2008–2017
In 2008, LVMH offered Philo a job as creative director and board member of the French Maison Céline. She agreed on the condition to continue working in London whilst showing in Paris, and devoted the first year to rebuilding the business by opening a design studio in a derelict Georgian town house on Cavendish Square in London. She presented her debut collection the next year to much critical acclaim.

Philo’s tenure at Céline was marked by a succession of “it” bags, among them the Trapeze and Luggage totes, and the slim Trio cross-body. In 2013, she also created a Birkenstock sandal composed of the brand’s Arizona and a mink covered footbed.

Philo’s first ad campaign for Céline notably did not include the heads of the models, ensuring the focus would be on the clothes and bags. For her 2015 ad campaign, Juergen Teller photographed writer Joan Didion. For Céline’s Spring/Summer 2017 collection, Philo worked with artist Dan Graham to create Showing off the body (2016), a glass S-shaped pavilion at the Tennis Club de Paris in which the runway show took place during Paris Fashion Week in 2016.

According to New York Times fashion critic Vanessa Friedman, Philo “made Céline matter in a way it never had before”. Her work at Céline redefined what women aspire to wear, with her minimalist aesthetic, clean lines and tonal colour palette gaining traction with critics and consumers alike. Consistently name checked by fashion insiders as the label they want to wear, Philo successfully resuscitated a tired Parisian house and recast it as an imperative part of each season’s fashion dialogue.

In 2017 after 10 years of working at Céline and much speculation in the media it was announced that Philo would step down as creative director after the Pre-Fall 2018 collection.

Phoebe Philo, 2021–present

In 2021, Philo announced she would launch a brand under her own name. LVMH is a minority stakeholder.

Recognition
In 2010, the inaugural issue of The Gentlewoman featured Philo on the cover. She was named by Time Magazine as amongst the world’s 100 most influential people in 2014.

Philo was appointed Officer of the Order of the British Empire (OBE) in the 2014 New Year Honours for services to fashion. Other honours include:
 2011: "International Designer of the Year" by the CFDA
 2010: "British Designer of the Year" by the British Fashion Council
 2005: "British Designer of the Year" by the British Fashion Council
 2003: "Best Dressed" by January issue of Vogue

Personal life 
Philo married English gallerist and art dealer Max Wigram (b. 1966) in July 2004. They live in Brondesbury, London and have three children; jewelry designer Solange Azagury-Partridge is godmother to Philo’s son.

References

1973 births
Living people
Alumni of Central Saint Martins
British women fashion designers
English fashion designers
Officers of the Order of the British Empire